Weyer may refer to:

Places
 Weyer, Bas-Rhin, a commune in Alsace, France
 Weyer, Austria, a town in Upper Austria
 Weyer, Germany, a municipality in Rhineland-Palatinate
 Weyer, New York, a hamlet
 Burgruine Weyer,  a ruined castle in Austria

People with the surname
 Francis Weyer, better known as Francis Goya (born 1946), Belgian composer and guitarist
 Jerry Weyer (born 1986), Luxembourgian politician
 Johann Weyer (1515–1588), Dutch physician, occultist, and demonologist
 Hannah Weyer, American filmmaker
 Hans Hermann Weyer, German socialite
 Jacob Weyer (1620s–1670), German painter
 Johann Peter Weyer (1794–1864), German architect
 Lee Weyer (1936–1988), American baseball umpire
 Martin Vander Weyer, British journalist and editor
 Sebastian Weyer, German Rubik's cube speedsolver
 Sylvain Van de Weyer (1802–1874), 8th Prime Minister of Belgium

See also
 
 Weijers, a surname; also Weyers
 Weyher
 Weyers
 Van de Weyer